Stephanie Jayne Darby  (born 23 April 1988) is an English professional footballer who plays for Women's Super League club Manchester City and the England women's national team. At club level, Houghton started at Sunderland in her native North East England before moving on to Leeds United in 2007 then Arsenal Ladies in 2010. She broke into the Sunderland team as a striker before moving back into midfield and later into defence.

Since her debut in 2007, Houghton has played over 100 times for the England national team. She suffered serious injuries immediately before the 2007 World Cup and Euro 2009, but recovered to play in the 2011 World Cup and Euro 2013. She was made England captain in January 2014. At the 2012 London Olympics, Houghton scored three goals in Great Britain's four games, including winners against New Zealand and Brazil.

Houghton was appointed Member of the Order of the British Empire (MBE) in the 2016 New Year Honours for services to football.  She was awarded the Freedom of the City of Sunderland on 8 March 2023.

Club career
Houghton began her career playing for five years at Sunderland. She helped Sunderland to win promotion from the Northern Division in 2005–06 and then won the FA Young Player of the Year Award in 2006–07. After Sunderland were relegated that season, Houghton became a target for Arsenal and Everton. She eventually joined Leeds United Ladies. After helping Leeds win the 2010 FA Women's Premier League Cup, Houghton signed for Arsenal in August of that year.

On 5 December 2013, it was announced that Houghton had signed an agreement to leave Arsenal for new WSL side Manchester City on 1 January 2014. Houghton signed a two-year contract extension with Manchester City on 24 January 2020.

International career

England

Houghton was involved with England at U16 schools, U19, U20, U21 and U23 level. She was called into the full squad for a match against Germany on 25 October 2006, when Katie Chapman withdrew with an illness. She was an unused substitute in the 5–1 defeat in Aalen. She made her debut in the next match, replacing Emily Westwood after 73 minutes of a 6–0 win over Russia in Milton Keynes on 8 March 2007. Her first start came three days later, in a 1–0 win over Scotland at Adams Park. She missed the 2007 World Cup with a broken leg and Euro 2009 with a damaged cruciate ligament.

In May 2009, Houghton was one of the first 17 female players to be given central contracts by The Football Association. She played in all three games at UEFA Women's Euro 2013 as England finished in last place; she described the result as "a massive disappointment personally and collectively as a squad." In January 2014 she was named the new captain for England's team under coach Mark Sampson, beginning on a 1–1 draw with Norway.

For the 2015 World Cup in Canada, Houghton was again named England's team captain. Houghton scored her first World Cup goal against Norway in the round of 16, and was chosen Player of the Match during the quarterfinals with Canada, which qualified England for their first semi-finals ever.

Houghton earned her 100th England Cap on 11 November 2018 against Sweden at New York Stadium in Rotherham, South Yorkshire. In May 2019 it was announced that Houghton had been selected for the 2019 FIFA Women's World Cup in France.
She scored a goal in the Round of 16 match against Cameroon.

Great Britain
Houghton was called up to the first Great Britain women's side for the 2012 Summer Olympics as a defender. She became the team's record goalscorer from the left–back position, scoring in all three group games to help Great Britain to win the group with a 100% record, as well as making important challenges to help ensure the side progressed without conceding a goal. Houghton was also named left back of the tournament due to her outstanding performance during the games.

In popular culture
In October 2014, Houghton was the first female player to appear on the cover of Shoot magazine.

Personal life
Houghton is married to former Bradford City defender Stephen Darby. They married on 21 June 2018.
On 18 September 2018, Darby announced his retirement from professional football at the age of 29 after being diagnosed with motor neurone disease. She was recognized as one of the BBC's 100 women of 2017.

Career statistics

Club

International
Statistics accurate as of match played 27 July 2021.

International goals
For England

Scores and results list England's goal tally first.

For Great Britain
Scores and results list Great Britain's goal tally first.

Honours

Leeds United
FA Women's Premier League Cup: 2009–10

Arsenal
FA Women's Cup: 2010–11, 2012–13
FA WSL: 2011, 2012
FA WSL Cup: 2011, 2012, 2013

Manchester City
FA WSL Cup: 2014, 2016, 2018–19, 2021–22
FA WSL: 2016
FA Women's Cup: 2016–17, 2018–19, 2019–20

England
Cyprus Cup: 2009, 2013, 2015
FIFA Women's World Cup third place: 2015
SheBelieves Cup: 2019

See also
 List of women's footballers with 100 or more caps

References

External links

Steph Houghton at the Leeds Carnegie website
Steph Houghton at the Manchester City F.C. website
Steph Houghton at the FA website
 
 

1988 births
Living people
Sportspeople from Durham, England
Footballers from County Durham
English women's footballers
Sunderland A.F.C. Ladies players
Leeds United Women F.C. players
Arsenal W.F.C. players
England women's international footballers
FA Women's National League players
Women's Super League players
2011 FIFA Women's World Cup players
Footballers at the 2012 Summer Olympics
2015 FIFA Women's World Cup players
2019 FIFA Women's World Cup players
Footballers at the 2020 Summer Olympics
Olympic footballers of Great Britain
Manchester City W.F.C. players
England women's under-23 international footballers
Women's association football forwards
Women's association football midfielders
Women's association football defenders
Women's association football utility players
Members of the Order of the British Empire
BBC 100 Women
FIFA Century Club
UEFA Women's Euro 2017 players
Association footballers' wives and girlfriends